Agonopterix caucasiella is a moth in the family Depressariidae. It was described by Ole Karsholt, Alexandr L. Lvovsky and Charlotte Nielsen in 2006. It is found in the Caucasus.

The wingspan is 20–24 mm. The forewings are dark reddish brown mixed with black scales and some white scales near the base. There are black scales alternating with pink scales along the costal margin and the discal dot is white. There are two white dots in the middle of the cell. Between these two dots and the discal dot is an additional small white dot. The hindwings are grey with darker veins.

The larvae feed on Heracleum mantegazzianum. They feed on the buds, flowers and developing fruits within the umbels.

References

Moths described in 2006
Agonopterix
Moths of Asia